Fountain Park is a neighborhood of St. Louis, Missouri. Originally the Aubert Place subdivision, it was laid out by John Lay in 1857. The Fountain Park neighborhood is located in north St. Louis with Martin Luther King Drive on the north, Delmar Boulevard on the south, Walton Avenue on the east, and Kingshighway Boulevard on the west. It is just two blocks north of the Central West End (CWE) of the city. The Fountain Park neighborhood is named after Fountain Park, a small oval-shaped city park near its center. A Martin Luther King Jr. statue sculpted by Rudolph Edward Torrini is situated on the west side of the park.

The park at the neighborhood's center hosts large Juneteenth celebrations since the mid-2000s. The space was reserved for a public park in 1857 and was donated to the city by John Lay in 1889. The fountain in its center was given by the Merchants Exchange. Residents and supporters participate in the Operation Brightside clean-up and the National Night Out.

Demographics
In 2010 Fountain Park's racial makeup was 97.4% Black, 1.1% White, 1.2% Two or More Races, and 0.1% Some Other Race. 0.5% of the population was of Hispanic or Latino origin.

In 2020 Fountain Park's racial makeup was 89.2% Black, 3.6% White, 1.1% American Indian or Alaska Native, 4.2% Two or More Races, and 1.9% Some Other Race. 1.7% of the population was of Hispanic or Latino origin.

See also
 Delmar Divide
 Neighborhoods of St. Louis

References

Neighborhoods in St. Louis
1857 establishments in Missouri
Parks in St. Louis